This is a list of events and openings related to amusement parks that occurred in 2017. These various lists are not exhaustive.

Amusement parks

Opening

Malaysia Movie Animation Park Studios – June 26
Spain Ferrari Land – April 7
United States Volcano Bay – May 25
United States Park at OWA – July 21
Japan Legoland Japan – April 1
Indonesia Jawa Timur Park 3 – December 11
Belgium Comic Station Antwerp

Change of ownership
 Six Flags Hurricane Harbor Concord – Premier Parks » Six Flags

Birthday

 United States Adventureland (New York) - 55th birthday
 Germany Phantasialand – 50th birthday
 United States Epcot – 35th birthday 
 France Disneyland Paris – 25th birthday 
 England Chessington World of Adventures – 30th birthday 
 United States Kentucky Kingdom - 30th birthday
 United States Kings Island – 45th birthday 
 New Zealand Rainbow's End - 35th birthday
 United States Six Flags Fiesta Texas – 25th birthday 
 United States Six Flags Over Georgia – 50th birthday 
 France Walt Disney Studios Park – 15th birthday 
 Canada La Ronde – 50th birthday 
 Australia Luna Park Melbourne – 105th birthday 
 Italy Mirabilandia – 25th birthday 
 France Futuroscope – 30th birthday
 Netherlands Efteling – 65th birthday 
 Hong Kong, China Ocean Park Hong Kong – 40th birthday
 United States Wild Waves Theme Park - 40th birthday

Closed
 Space World – December 31
 Sega Republic – June 1
 Boomers! Fresno – September 4

Additions

Roller coasters

New

Relocated

Refurbished

Other attractions

New

Refurbished

Closed attractions & roller coasters

References

Amusement parks by year
Amusement parks